Pulse is a 1988 American science-fiction horror film written and directed by Paul Golding, drawing influence from previous works of science fiction and horror, and starring Cliff De Young, Roxanne Hart, Joseph Lawrence, Matthew Lawrence, and Charles Tyner. The film's title refers to a highly aggressive and intelligent pulse of electricity that terrorizes the occupants of a suburban house in Los Angeles, California. The film was produced through Columbia Pictures and the Aspen Film Society and distributed by Columbia Pictures. The titular Pulse and its accompanying elements were designed by Cinema Research Corporation.

Plot
A highly aggressive, paranormal intelligence thriving within the electrical grid system of Los Angeles, California is moving from house to house. It terrorizes the occupants by taking control of the appliances, killing them or causing them to wreck the house in an effort to destroy it. Once this has been accomplished, it travels along the power lines to the next house, and the terror restarts. Having thus wrecked one household in a quiet, suburban neighborhood, the pulse finds itself in the home of a boy's divorced father whom he is visiting. It gradually takes control of everything, injuring the stepmother, and trapping father and son, who must fight their way out.

Cast
Cliff De Young as Bill Rockland
Roxanne Hart as Ellen Rockland
Joey Lawrence as David Rockland
Matthew Lawrence as Stevie
Charles Tyner as Old Man Holger
Dennis Redfield as Pete
Robert Romanus as Paul
Myron Healey as Howard
Michael Rider as Foreman
Jean Sincere as Ruby
Terry Beaver as Policeman
Greg Norberg as Policeman
Tim Russ as Policeman

Release
The film was promoted by the taglines "It traps you in your house...then pulls the plug," "In every second of every day, it improves our lives. And in a flash, it can end them," and also "the ultimate shocker."

Reception
Pulse has a 64% approval rating at the online review aggregator Rotten Tomatoes based on 14 reviews.

Music
The musical score for Pulse was composed by Jay Ferguson, who also composed "Pictures of You" from the soundtrack to The Terminator, and the film score to A Nightmare on Elm Street 5: The Dream Child.

References

External links

1980s science fiction horror films
1988 films
1988 horror films
1980s English-language films
Films set in Los Angeles
American haunted house films
Columbia Pictures films
1988 directorial debut films
Techno-horror films
1980s American films